Bernard Gulić (born 9 April 1980) is a Croatian retired football defender.

References

1980 births
Living people
Footballers from Zagreb
Association football defenders
Croatian footballers
NK Hrvatski Dragovoljac players
NK Inter Zaprešić players
NK Bistra players
Croatian Football League players
First Football League (Croatia) players